America was a 60-gun ship of the line of the Spanish Navy, launched in 1736.

She was captured by the British Royal Navy at the seizure of Havana on 13 August 1762, and burnt.

References

Garcia-Torralba Pérez, Enrique, Navios de la Real Armada, 1700-1860. Colegio Oficial de Ingenieros Navales y Oceánicos de Espana, 2015. .
Harbron, John D., Trafalgar and the Spanish Navy. Conway Maritime Press, 1988. .

Ships of the line of the Spanish Navy
1730s ships
Ships built in Cuba